Note: Within this list, Chinese encyclopedia translates leishu, a traditional Chinese reference work that, unlike a modern encyclopedia with expressly written articles, consists of excerpts from primary texts arranged by categories. Fascicle translates juan 卷 "scroll; fascicle; volume" for early (pre-20th century) encyclopedias and volume refers to modern encyclopedias.

 
Encyclopedias
Lists of encyclopedias